Olli Saarinen (born 29 July 1953) is a Finnish ice hockey player. He competed in the men's tournament at the 1980 Winter Olympics.

References

External links
 

1953 births
Living people
Olympic ice hockey players of Finland
Ice hockey players at the 1980 Winter Olympics
People from Mänttä-Vilppula
Sportspeople from Pirkanmaa